Chiara Teresa Iezzi  (February 27, 1973) is an Italian actress and musician. She was part of the duo Paola & Chiara until 2013, when she decided to dedicate herself to acting.

Biography

Singer 
After her debut in jazz and funk bands, in 1996 she started the duo Paola & Chiara with Paola Iezzi signing a contract with Sony Music Italy. The duo took part to the Sanremo Music Festival event 3 times (1997, 1998, 2005).

In 2000 they released the single Vamos a bailar (Esta vida nueva) winning the platinum record and obtaining an international success with the album Television.

In 2007 Iezzi released her first EP as a solo singer, Nothing at All; it was one of the top-selling singles in Italy in 2007. The official video was filmed in London by Maki Gherzi. 
In 2013 she released the Ep L'Universo. 

In December 2013 she released a cover of the song Hallelujah by Leonard Cohen.

In 2015 she took part as contestant to the third edition of The Voice of Italy.

Actress 
Iezzi has been fascinated in acting since adolescence. She started to attend an acting school in her spare time while she was graduating as a fashion designer. She took part in some video clips and when she was 22 a director invited her in a casting in Rome.

In 2010 she collaborated to the soundtrack "Maledimiele", a movie directed by Marco Pozzi, singing the main theme L'altra parte di me ("The Other Side of Me"). The song won the Roma Videoclip award.

In 2011 she began to study acting seriously.

In 2014 she got into the cast of Under the Series (2014) by Ivan Silvestrini, in the role of Tea; the last of the ten episodes was presented at the Venice International Film Festival, at the Rome Fiction Fest and at the Roma Web Fest.

In 2015 she was taken for the second season of Alex & Co. in the role of Linda's mother and owner of the school, Victoria Williams. She took part into Il ragazzo della Giudecca and later in the same year she joined the cast of Louis Nero's film The Broken Key, in the role of Esther.

A year later she was chosen by Prada for the mini-fashion film The Hour of the Wolf for the Prada Journal III eyewear campaign.

Chiara works as a producer and director, founding in February 2014 her own company: Licantro Bros Film.

Private life 
In 2008 she started a conversion to Judaism.

In 2014 she married Meir Cohen.

In October 2021 she will be in the cast of The Solemn Vow, a movie directed by Eros D'Antona on Amazon prime Usa and Canada. Since 2016, she lives between Milan and Los Angeles.

Discography

Singles

Music videos

Filmography

Films

Television

References

External links 

1973 births
Italian women singers
Living people
Actresses from Milan
20th-century Italian Jews
20th-century Italian women